The Times-Journal newspaper appears three times a week is published in Fort Payne, Alabama and serves the DeKalb County, Alabama region.  
The Times-Journal was a Southern Newspapers publication for 60 years before selling to Patrick Graham in 2019, along with sister papers in Albertville and Scottsboro.   The Times-Journal resulted from the merger in 1959 of the Fort Payne Journal, first published in 1878, and the Times-New Era.  The latter newspaper was the product of the 1951 merger of The DeKalb Times and The Collinsville New Era.

Of the 25 daily newspapers published in Alabama, the Times-Journal has the nineteenth highest daily circulation.

The Times-Journal has won numerous awards from state newspaper associations, such as the Alabama Press Association and the Associated Press Managing Editors.

Weekly Post
The Weekly Post was a weekly newspaper published in Rainsville, Alabama, by Southern Newspapers and serving the DeKalb County, Alabama region. It was founded in 1986 by Carey and Teri Baker. In 2010 the Times-Journal absorbed the smaller sister-paper, the Weekly Post.

Awards

2018 Better Newspaper Contest - Alabama Press Association

References

External links

 
 
 Official website (Archive)

Newspapers published in Alabama
Publications established in 1878
Daily newspapers published in the United States
Defunct newspapers published in Alabama
Publications established in 1986
Publications disestablished in 2010
2010 disestablishments in Alabama